Vuk Sotirović (Serbian Cyrillic: Вук Сотировић; born 13 July 1982) is a Serbian football striker who last played for Zemun in the Serbian First League.

Career
In February 2011, he was loaned to Jagiellonia Białystok on a half year deal.

He was released from Śląsk Wrocław on 2 July 2011.

Honours
Śląsk Wrocław
 Ekstraklasa Cup: 2009

References

External links
 

1982 births
Living people
Footballers from Belgrade
Serbian footballers
Serbian expatriate footballers
ŁKS Łódź players
Zawisza Bydgoszcz players
Jagiellonia Białystok players
Śląsk Wrocław players
Pogoń Szczecin players
Ekstraklasa players
Association football forwards
Serbian expatriate sportspeople in Poland
FK BSK Borča players
Cypriot First Division players
Nea Salamis Famagusta FC players
Serbian expatriate sportspeople in Cyprus
Serbian expatriate sportspeople in Hong Kong
Expatriate footballers in Poland
Expatriate footballers in Cyprus
Expatriate footballers in Hong Kong
Hougang United FC players
Singapore Premier League players
FK Javor Ivanjica players
FK Novi Pazar players
FK Radnički 1923 players
FK Borac Čačak players
FK Zemun players